Xudum Airport  is a private airstrip that serves the Xudum Okavango Delta Lodge, a wildlife safari camp in the Okavango Delta of Botswana.

See also

Transport in Botswana
List of airports in Botswana

References

External links 
OpenStreetMap - Xudum

Xudum Lodge web site

Airports in Botswana
North-West District (Botswana)